Nikola-Penye is a rural locality (a village) in Rostilovskoye Rural Settlement, Gryazovetsky District, Vologda Oblast, Russia. The population was 8 as of 2002.

Geography 
Nikola-Penye is located 13 km southeast of Gryazovets (the district's administrative centre) by road. Skorodumka is the nearest rural locality.

References 

Rural localities in Gryazovetsky District